The 1945 Campeon de Campeones was the 4th Mexican Super Cup football one-leg  match played on 1 June 1945.

 League winners: Club España
 Cup winners: Puebla

Match details

References
- Statistics of Mexican Super Cup. (RSSSF)

Campeón de Campeones
Campeón
June 1945 sports events in North America